Naseer Ahmad Faiq is the Permanent Representative of Afghanistan to the United Nations since 17 December 2021.

Since December 2021, Afghanistan U.N. Mission diplomat Faiq has served as Afghanistan's chargé d’affaires to the UN. Taliban government of Afghanistan's pick for UN Ambassador Mohammad Suhail Shaheen remains unrecognized.

References

Living people
Permanent Representatives of Afghanistan to the United Nations
Year of birth missing (living people)